The University of Siena (abbreviation: UNISI) in Siena, Tuscany, is one of the oldest and first publicly funded universities in Italy. Originally called Studium Senese, the institution was founded in 1240. It had around 20,000 students in 2006, nearly half of Siena's total population of around 54,000. In the academic year 2022–2023, it had  a total undergraduate enrollment of 16.342 and graduate enrollment of 3.161. Today, the University of Siena is best known for its Schools of Law, Medicine, and Economics and Management.

History

The early studium

The School of Humanities and Philosophy 
On December 26, 1240, Ildebrandino Cacciaconti, the then podestà of Siena, signed a decree imposing a tax on citizens of Siena who rented rooms to students of the local "Studium Senese". The money from this tax went to pay for the salaries of the maestri (teachers) of this new studium. The studium was further supported when, in 1252, Pope Innocent IV declared both its teachers and students completely immune from taxes and forced labour levied on their person or property by the city of Siena. Moreover, the commune exempted teachers of law and Latin from military service and teachers of Latin were also excused from their duties as night watchmen. By the early 14th century, there were five teachers of Latin, logic and law and two doctors of natural sciences (medicine).

One of the most notable maestri of the School of Medicine was Pietro Ispano (Pope John XXI). Ispano was an illustrious philosopher, personal doctor to Emperor Frederick II, and in 1276 became Pope John XXI.

In 1321, the studium was able to attract a larger number or pupils due to a mass exodus from the prestigious University of Bologna when one of its students was sentenced to death by Bologna's magistrates for supposedly kidnapping a young woman. Partly at the instigation of their law lecturer Guglielmo Tolomei, the student body there unleashed a great protest at the Bolognese authority and Siena, supported by generous funding from the local commune, was able to accommodate the students resigning from the Studium Bolognese.

The university under changing states
The studium of Siena was eventually promoted to the status of "Studium Generale" by Charles IV, shortly after his coronation as Holy Roman Emperor in 1355. This both placed the teachers and students under the safeguard of the imperial authority (protecting them from the local magistracy) and also meant that the licences (licentiae docendi) granted by the university were licences ubique docendi. These licences entitled the person receiving them to teach throughout Christendom.

The Casa della Sapienza was built in the early 15th century as a center combining classrooms and housing for those enrolled in the Studium. It had been proposed by bishop Mormille in 1392, was completed twenty years later, and its first occupants took up residence in 1416. Room and board in 1416 cost fifty gold florins for a semester.

By the mid-14th century, Siena had declined as a power in Tuscany, eclipsed by the rise in power of Florence, who defeated the Republic of Siena in 1555. The city authorities, however, successfully asked the Medici (the hereditary dukes of Florence at the time) to preserve the academy. Francesco and later Grand Duke Ferdinando I, reforms were made with new statutes and new prerogatives. The post of Rettore (Rector), elected by students and city magistrates, was also instituted.

In 1737, the Medici line became extinct and the rule of Tuscany passed to the French House of Lorraine. In this period, the Tuscan economist Sallustio Bandini, seemingly determined to "improve the intellectual stimulation of his native Siena" solicited scholarships from rich patrons for the university and also set up a large library, which he eventually bequeathed to the university.

In 1808, when the Napoleonic forces occupied Tuscany, they eliminated the Studium Senese and the doors of the University were not opened again until after the defeat of Napoleon and the restoration of Ferdinand III as the Grand Duke of Tuscany.

The university in the Risorgimento
During the Risorgimento, the movement towards the unification of Italy as a single state, Sienese students organised groups which were openly patriotic. They publicly expressed their dissent and, during the April 1848 revolts in Tuscany, three professors, one assistant and fifty-five students formed the Compagnia della Guardia Universitaria to participate in the battles of Curtatone and of Montanara. The troop's flag is still preserved in the Chancellor's building. All of this passion for the new republic could not but trouble the Grand Duke and in the end he closed down the School of Medicine permitting only Law and Theology to continue

After the Second Italian War of Independence in 1859 and its aftermath, Tuscany and with it Siena were controlled by the Kingdom of Sardinia, which was to become the Kingdom of Italy. The Sienese academy eventually recovered from the unrest, thanks to initiatives by the city's private enterprises and a series of legislative acknowledgements that boosted the reputation of the School of Pharmacy and that of Obstetrics (and consequently the School of Medicine itself) while the old hospital Santa Maria della Scala was transformed into General University Hospital. Some time later in 1880, the Law Faculty established the Circolo Giuridico or Legal Circle, where issues pertaining to law studies were examined in depth through seminars and lectures

The university in modern Italy
In 1892, the Minister of Public Education, Ferdinando Martini, launched a proposal aimed at suppressing the Sienese academy’s activities. Siena perceived this as a declaration of war and was backed immediately by a general tradesmen’s strike, the intervention of all of the town’s institutions and by a genuine uprising of the population – all of which induced the minister to withdraw the project. Having escaped this danger, the town went back to investing its resources in the university setting up new degrees and new faculties. The bank Monte dei Paschi di Siena financed the construction of the biology department.

The 20th century witnessed the growth of the University of Siena, with the student population escalating from four hundred between the wars to more than 20,000 in the last few years.

During the start of the academic year, on November 7, 1990 the Sienese academy celebrated its 750th anniversary.

Notable students, alumni and faculty
Pietro Ispano (c. 1215–1277), Pope John XXI, Professor of Medicine
Cino da Pistoia (1270–1336/37), Professor of Law
Antonio de Venafro (1459–1530), advisor to Pandolfo Petrucci, Ruler of the Republic of Siena
Giovanni Maria Ciocchi del Monte (1487–1555), Pope Julius III, studied law at Siena
Francesco Accarigi (c. 1557–1622), Professor of Civil Law
Virginia Angiola Borrino (1880–1965), Professor of Medicine and the first woman to serve as head of a University Pediatric Ward in Italy
Piero Calamandrei (1889–1956), Professor at the Law school in Siena
Richard M. Goodwin (1913–1996), Professor, mathematician and economist
Norberto Bobbio (1909–2004), Professor of Philosophy
Frank Hahn (1925–2013), Professor of Economics, Director of the PhD program of the Economics Department 
Mauro Barni (1927-2017), Professor of Bioethics, Rector and Mayor of Siena
Jean Blondel (born 1929), Professor of comparative politics
Luigi Berlinguer (born 1932), Professor of Law, Rector and Minister of Education
Samuel Bowles (born 1939), American economist, professor of Economics
Antonio Tabucchi (1943–2012), Italian writer, Professor of Portuguese language and literature
Paul Ginsborg (born 1945), British historian, Professor of Contemporary History
Riccardo Francovich (1946-2007), archaeologist and professor of Medieval archaeology 
Desiderio Passali (born 1947), director of the ENT department and professor of otolaryngology
Rino Rappuoli (born 1952), Italian Biologist
Carlo Cottarelli (born 1954), economist and former director of the International Monetary Fund
Emanuele Papi (born 1959), professor of classical archaeologist, director of Italian Archaeological School of Athens
Yusuf Garaad Omar (born 1960), journalist and politician
Antonio Giordano (born 1962), Professor of Pathology
Carlo Bellieni (born 1962), associate professor of Pediatrics, bioethicist
Domenico Prattichizzo (born 1965), Professor of Robotics and Automation

Organization
Since 2012, after the general reform of Italian Universities ("Gelmini Act"), the University is composed of fifteen departments, grouped in four areas:
 Biomedical and Medical Sciences
 Department of Medical Biotechnologies
 Department of Molecular and Developmental Medicine
 Department of Medicine, Surgery and Neuroscience
 Economics, Law and Political Sciences
 Department of Economics and Statistics
 Department of Law
 Department of Political and International Sciences
 Department of Business and Law
 Experimental Sciences
 Department of Biotechnology, Chemistry and Pharmacy
 Department of Information Engineering and Mathematics
 Department of Life Sciences
 Department of Physical Sciences, Earth and Environment
 Literature, History, Philosophy and the Arts
 Department of Philology and Literary Criticism
 Department of Education, Human Sciences and Intercultural Communication
 Department of Social, Political and Cognitive Sciences
 Department of History and Cultural Heritage
Each department offers graduate and undergraduate courses.

Since 2014 the Department of Economics and Statistics and the Department of Business and Law merged their undergraduate and graduate courses into the School of Economics and Management (SEM).

Formerly, the University was composed of nine schools:

 The School of Economics
 The School of Engineering
 The School of Humanities and Philosophy
 The School of Humanities and Philosophy – Arezzo
 The School of Jurisprudence
 The School of Mathematical, Physical and Natural Sciences
 The School of Medicine and Surgery
 The School of Pharmacy
 The School of Political Science

Siena's campus is the city. The academy lives as an integral part of the urban fabric in both space and time. Thus there is an uneasy equilibrium between city and university, where 20,000 students live among the 50,000 Sienese. While the Sienese are proud of their native traditions, the more polyglot university prides itself on diversity, with which as the historian Guicciardini would put it, with an ambiguity possibly ironic,  – there is no genius.

Recently, the University has returned historical buildings to the city, which are being made into apartments or used by the contradas. At the same time, it is thanks to the intervention of the University that many buildings which risked falling into ruin were saved, making institutions of study out of a part of the city patrimony that might have otherwise been lost. The Faculties of Engineering and Literature, for example, have found space for their departments in the large rooms of what was once the San Niccolò Psychiatric Hospital. The same holds true for the transformation of the former Convent of Santa Chiara into the first collegiate residence in Italy, reserved for those working towards a European postgraduate degree. The church of San Vigilio serves as university chapel.

New university buildings have even been built in the city centre such as the one that houses the Faculty of Political Science and Law, whose architectural style blends with the secular surroundings creating a balance between preservation and innovation. The ten university dormitories are adapted to the urban fabric and are located within the historical centre (Fontebranda, Mattioli, Porrione, Sperandie, San Marco), on the outskirts (Acquacalda) and near the extended areas of the university (San Miniato).

Degree Courses
For the academic year 2017-18 the following degree courses are provided (medium of instruction in parenthesis)
 Biomedical and Medical Sciences
  Undergraduate (3 years)
 Biomedical laboratory techniques 
 Biotechnologies 
 Cardiocirculatory and cardiovascular perfusion techniques 
 Dental hygiene 
 Dietistic 
 Environment and the workplace prevention techniques 
 Imaging and radiotherapy techniques 
 Midwifery 
 Nursing 
 Orthoptic and ophthalmologic assistance 
 Physiotherapy 
 Speech and language therapy 
 Graduate (2 years)
 Health professions of rehabilitation sciences 
 Medical biotechnologies 
 Nursing and midwifery sciences 
 Single cycle (6 years)
 Dentistry and dental prosthodontics 
 Medicine and surgery 
 Economics, Law and Political Sciences
  Undergraduate (3 years)
 Communication sciences 
 Counsellor of labour law and labour relations 
 Economics and banking 
 Economics and business 
 Political sciences 
 Social work 
 Graduate (2 years)
 Anthropology and visual studies 
 Economics and management of financial institutions 
 Economics 
 Finance 
 International accounting and management 
 Language and mind: linguistics and cognitive studies 
 Management and governance 
 Public and cultural diplomacy 
 Sciences of administrations 
 Statistics for sample surveys 
 Strategies and techniques of communication 
 Single cycle (5 years)
 Law 
 Experimental Sciences
  Undergraduate (3 years)
 Biological sciences 
 Chemical sciences 
 Computer and information engineering 
 Engineering management 
 Geological sciences 
 Mathematics 
 Natural and environmental sciences 
 Physics and advanced technologies 
 Graduate (2 years)
 Applied mathematics 
 Biology 
 Chemistry 
 Computer and automation engineering 
 Ecotoxicology and environmental sustainability 
 Electronics and communications engineering 
 Engineering management 
 Geosciences and applied geology 
 Health biology 
 Single cycle (5 years)
 Pharmaceutical chemistry and technology 
 Pharmacy 
 Literature, History, Philosophy and the Arts
  Undergraduate (3 years)
 Communication sciences 
 Education 
 History and cultural heritage 
 Languages for intercultural and business communication 
 Studies in literature and philosophy 
 Graduate (2 years)
 Anthropology and visual studies 
 Archaeology 
 Classics 
 Education sciences and educational consulting for organizations 
 History and philosophy 
 History of art 
 Language and mind: linguistics and cognitive studies 
 Modern literatures 
 Strategies and techniques of communication

Points of interest
 Orto Botanico dell'Università di Siena, the university's botanical garden

See also
 Coimbra Group (a network of leading European universities)
 List of medieval universities
 List of Italian universities
 Siena
 WebCrow

Notes and references

External links
University of Siena Website

Bibliography
 de Ridder-Symoens, Hilde: A History of the University in Europe, Volume 1: Universities in the Middle Ages. Cambridge University Press, 1992 
 Waley, Daniel: Siena and the Sienese in the thirteenth century. Cambridge University Press, 1991 
 Wahnbaeck, Till: Luxury and Public Happiness: Political Economy in the Italian Enlightenment Oxford University Press, 2004 

 
Universities in Tuscany
Buildings and structures in Siena
1240 establishments in Europe
13th-century establishments in the Republic of Siena
Siena, University of